Never Say No to Panda ("Panda is not told no") is a series of television commercials produced in Egypt by Advantage Marketing for Arab Dairy, manufacturers of Panda Cheese. The commercials, which feature a giant panda who terrorizes people for not wanting to try the cheese, became a viral Internet hit.
The ads were created by the Elephant Cairo agency and written by Ali Ali and Maged Nassar.

Premise
In each commercial, a person is offered Panda cheese, and declines, this causes a giant panda to suddenly appear in front of them while the Buddy Holly & The Picks song "True Love Ways" plays in the background. The panda stares at the person for a few seconds before going into a silent but violent outburst, destroying objects around them, such as wrecking an office computer, pushing the television down the floor, or pouring marinara sauce over an unprepared pizza. 

The mother offered the cheese for their children, but their father refuses in two commercials (such as birthday party and rest area), a father said there were lots of food in the party, this again causes it to appear, clapping its hands and staring for a few seconds while the same song playing in the background, taking out the birthday cake and throwing it at the wall. The other father is playing catch with his son all day, his son accidentally passes the ball to the panda, the father's wife and daughter are shocked. A panda went to squish the ball with its bare hands, playing in the lyrics “Just you know why…Why…”, fading in the background, it then repeats twice, using a screw to crush the car glass, The lyrics “just you know why” sung by The Picks comes back again, fades, and then return to normal. This slogan is called “Kids not exempted!” as well as the Panda Cheese slogan, “Never Say No To Panda”, the birthday commercial must be the same Panda cheese slogan (in Egyptian Arabic).

One example is a pair of commercials featuring a father and son at the grocery store. The son suggests they buy Panda cheese, but the father says their shopping cart is full. The panda appears and stares at the father before tipping over the shopping cart and stomping on the spilled merchandise. In the second commercial, the father and son return to the store, and the father is intimidated by the panda enough to buy two packages of Panda cheese before everyone walks away peacefully.

Awards
In 2010, the commercials won two grands prix at the Dubai Lynx International Advertising Festival in May, a Silver Film Lion at the Cannes International Advertising Festival in June, and a Gold for Film at the Epica Awards.

References

External links
 
Arab Dairy's Website
Advantage Advertising

2010s in Egyptian television
Egyptian television commercials
Viral videos
Internet memes
Internet memes introduced in 2010